Michel Cassé, is a French astrophysicist, writer and poet born in Fleurance in Gers in 1943. He works at CEA (Commissariat à l'énergie atomique),  and at French National Centre for Scientific Research (CNRS) and specializes nucleosynthesis and quantum mechanics.

Publications 
 Stellar Alchemy: The Celestial Origin of Atoms, 2003 with Stephen Lyle 
 Astrophysique (in French), 2011, éditions Jean-Paul Bayol, 
 Nostalgie de la Lumière (in French), Belfond, 
Les Trous noirs en pleine lumière (in French), 2009, Odile Jacob, 
Cosmologie dite à Rimbaud (in French), 2007, éditions Jean-Paul Bayol, 
Théories du ciel. Espace perdu, temps retrouvé (in French), 2005, Rivages, 
Énergie noire, matière noire (in French), 2004, Odile Jacob, 
 Du vide et de la création (in French), 2001, Odile Jacob, 
 Généalogie de la matière. Retour aux sources célestes des éléments 2000 (in French), Odile Jacob,

References

1943 births
Living people
20th-century French astronomers
French poets
French physicists
People from Gers
French male poets
21st-century French astronomers